Isabella Harwood or Ross Neil (14 June 1837 – 29 May 1888) was a British novelist who also wrote dramas in verse.

Biography
Harwood was probably born in Dorset in 1837 where her parents Phillip Harwood and his wife Isabella Neil lived. Phillip Harwood was then a Unitarian minister in Bridport.

Between 1864 and 1870 she wrote four sensational novels which were published without attribution. Between 1871 and 1883 she wrote a number of unfashionable blank verse dramas which were said to be readable. Two were produced in Edinburgh and London but they were not favourably received.

Harwood lived with her father in London and then in Hastings. She died in St Mary-in-the-Castle in 1888 in Hastings a year after her father.

Works

Novels
Abbot's Cleve
Carleton Grange
Raymond's Heroine
Kathleen
The Heir Expectant
Plays
Lady Jane Grey; Inez, or, The Bride of Portugal

Plays
The Cid; The King and the Angel; Duke for a Day; or The Tailor of Brussels
Elfinella, or, Home from Fairyland; Lord and Lady Russell
Arabella Stuart; The Heir of Linne; Tasso
Eglantine
Andrea the Painter; Claudia's Choice; Orestes; Pandora

References

1837 births
1888 deaths
Writers from Dorset
English women novelists
British women dramatists and playwrights
19th-century English novelists
19th-century British dramatists and playwrights
19th-century English women writers
19th-century British writers